Ján Maslo (born 5 February 1986) is a Slovak professional footballer who currently plays for Ružomberok in the Fortuna Liga.

Club
In July 2011, Maslo joined Ukraine club Volyn Lutsk on a three-year contract.

In June 2014, Maslo moved to Kazakhstan Premier League side Shakhter Karagandy.

External links
 
 at mfkruzomberok.sk

References

1986 births
Living people
People from Dolný Kubín
Sportspeople from the Žilina Region
Slovak footballers
Slovakia youth international footballers
Slovakia under-21 international footballers
Slovak expatriate footballers
Association football defenders
MFK Ružomberok players
FC Volyn Lutsk players
FC Shakhter Karagandy players
Slovak Super Liga players
Ukrainian Premier League players
Kazakhstan Premier League players
Expatriate footballers in Ukraine
Slovak expatriate sportspeople in Ukraine
Expatriate footballers in Kazakhstan
Slovak expatriate sportspeople in Kazakhstan